Lokėnėliai is a village in Lithuania. It is located near the Jonava–Ukmergė road and the Lokys stream (tributary of Neris). According to the 2011 census, it had 14 residents. Lokės pėda (literally: bear's foot), an adventure park, was established in the village in 2005.

References

Villages in Jonava District Municipality